King, West Virginia may refer to:
King, Clay County, West Virginia
King, Wetzel County, West Virginia